Alfio Peraboni (8 May 1954 – 11 January 2011) was an Italian competitive sailor and Olympic medalist. He won a bronze medal in the Star class at the 1980 Summer Olympics in Moscow together with Giorgio Gorla, and also a bronze medal at the 1984 Summer Olympics in Los Angeles. He was born and died in Monza.

References

External links
 
 
 
 

1954 births
2011 deaths
Italian male sailors (sport)
Sailors at the 1980 Summer Olympics – Star
Sailors at the 1984 Summer Olympics – Star
Sailors at the 1988 Summer Olympics – Star
Olympic sailors of Italy
Olympic bronze medalists for Italy
Olympic medalists in sailing
Star class world champions
Medalists at the 1984 Summer Olympics
Medalists at the 1980 Summer Olympics
World champions in sailing for Italy